Costabieta is a minor genus of sea snails, marine gastropod mollusks in the family Pyramidellidae, the pyrams and their allies.

Species
Species within this genus include:
 Costabieta epentroma  (synonym: Rissoina epentroma Melvill, 1896)
 Costabieta horrida (Garrett, 1873)  (synonyms:  Rissoina horrida Garrett, 1873; Rissiona baxteriana Nevill, 1881; Costabieta paucina Laseron, 1956)
 Costabieta perforata Peñas & Rolán, 2017
 Costabieta portentosa Peñas & Rolán, 2017
Species brought into synonymy
 Costabieta fulgens (Turton, 1932): synonym of Alvania fulgens Turton, 1932
 Costabieta madreporica (Issel, 1869): synonym of Cingula madreporica Issel, 1869
  Costabieta paupera Thiele, 1925: synonym of Rissoa paupera Thiele, 1925
 Costabieta psammitica (Issel, 1869): synonym of Cingula psammatica Issel, 1869
 Costabieta paucina Laseron, 1956: synonym of Costabieta horrida (Garrett, 1873) 
 Costabieta sumatrana (Thiele, 1925): synonym of Rissoa sumatrana Thiele, 1925
 Costabieta tosaensis T. Habe, 1961: synonym of Pyramidelloides tosaensis Habe, 1961
 Costabieta waabitica (Issel, 1869): synonym of Cingula waabitica Issel, 1869

References

The Tibe Chrysallidini. ECIMAT (Estación de Ciencias Mariñas de Toralla) - Universidade de Vigo, 412 pp

External links
 To World Register of Marine Species
 OBIS : Costabieta; retrieved: 26 October 2011

Pyramidellidae